The Boston University Terriers women's hockey team will represent Boston University in the 2012–13 NCAA Division I women's ice hockey season.

Offseason
May 11, 2012: Terriers head coach Brian Durocher announced that the captains for the 2012-13 campaign will be Marie-Philip Poulin and Jill Cardella.

Recruiting

Exhibition

Regular season

Standings

Schedule

Conference record

Awards and honors
Sarah Lefort, Runner-Up, Hockey East Rookie of the Month (Month of December 2012) 
Marie-Philip Poulin, Runner-Up, Hockey East Player of the Month (Month of December 2012) 
Kerrin Sperry, Runner-Up, Hockey East Goaltender of the Month (Month of December 2012)

Team awards

References

Boston University
Boston University Terriers women's ice hockey seasons